Mercury 4 or variants may refer to:

 Mercury 4, a spacecraft of Project Mercury
Mercury4, an Australian boy band 2002–2004
 Mercury(IV), an unknown compound of the element Mercury
 Mercury IV, a 1929 version of the Bristol Mercury aircraft engine

See also
 Mercury (disambiguation)
Mercury-Redstone 4, the second U.S. human spaceflight, 1961
Mercury-Atlas 4, a 1961 unmanned space flight